Mordellistena nigrofasciata is a species of beetle in the genus Mordellistena of the family Mordellidae. It was described by Chûjô in 1935.

References

Beetles described in 1935
nigrofasciata